, is a 1972 Japanese kaiju film directed by Jun Fukuda, written by Shinichi Sekizawa, and produced by Tomoyuki Tanaka, with special effects by Teruyoshi Nakano. Distributed by Toho and produced under their effects-based subsidiary Toho-Eizo, it is the 12th film in the Godzilla franchise, and features the fictional monster characters Godzilla, Gigan, Anguirus, and King Ghidorah. The film stars Hiroshi Ishikawa, Yuriko Hishimi, Tomoko Umeda, and Minoru Takashima, alongside Haruo Nakajima as Godzilla, Kenpachiro Satsuma as Gigan, Koetsu Omiya as Anguirus, and Kanta Ina as King Ghidorah. It is the last film in which Godzilla was portrayed by Nakajima after playing the character since the original 1954 film; he subsequently retired from suit acting.

Godzilla vs. Gigan was released theatrically in Japan on March 12, 1972. It received a wide theatrical release in the United States in 1977 by Cinema Shares under the title Godzilla on Monster Island and was released in the UK by Miracle Films the same year as War of the Monsters.

Plot
Giant insectoid aliens resembling cockroaches from the dying planet "M Space Hunter Nebula" plot to colonize the Earth, their planet having become uninhabitable after another race on the planet polluted it, then died out from the effects of their own destruction. The aliens assume the forms of dead humans and work as the development staff of the peace-themed theme park, World Children's Land, the centerpiece of which is "Godzilla Tower". The Nebula M aliens plan to use the space creatures Gigan and King Ghidorah, guided by two "Action Signal Tapes", to wipe out human civilization.

Manga artist Gengo Kotaka stumbles onto their plan after being hired as a concept artist for the park. When Gengo and his friends accidentally obtain one of the Action Signal Tapes and play it, Godzilla and Anguirus hear the signal and realize something is amiss. Godzilla sends Anguirus to investigate. When Anguirus approaches Tokyo, the Japan Self Defense Forces, misunderstanding the monster's intentions, drive him away.

Anguirus reports back to Monster Island, and Godzilla follows it back to Japan to save the Earth from Gigan and King Ghidorah. The aliens attempt to kill Godzilla with a lethal laser cannon hidden inside Godzilla Tower, but Gengo and his companions use the aliens' over-reliance on technology against them, forcing the invaders to unwittingly destroy themselves. After a lengthy fight, Godzilla and Anguirus force Gigan and King Ghidorah back into space and then Godzilla and Anguirus swim back to Monster Island, but not before Godzilla turns around and gives a roar of triumph, in thanks to the human friends.

Cast

Production

Writing
Disappointed with the critical and commercial reception of Godzilla vs. Hedorah (1971), Tomoyuki Tanaka immediately began thinking about how to take Godzilla back to the golden era of the 1960’s. Taking note of the Champion Matsuri Festival Reissue of Ghidorah, the Three-Headed Monster in 1971 and Invasion of Astro-Monster in 1972, which drew in strong attendance of 1,350,000 people (whereas Godzilla vs. Hedorah had 400,000 people), Tanaka felt the best way to reinvigorate Godzilla was not to try new things, but bring back fan-favorite villain King Ghidorah.

He commissioned both Shinichi Sekizawa and Kaoru Mabuchi, to write different drafts for the next Godzilla film. Each of them coming up with their own separate concepts. Both writers were given stipulations from Tanaka though to include King Ghidorah and a new monster, Gigan. Presumably, someone at the studio also insisted upon the Godzilla Tower, as it appears in both writers’ drafts as well. The two drafts were turned in on July 1971.

Two drafts were turned in on July 1971. Kimura's draft, titled Godzilla vs. The Space Monsters: Earth Destruction Directive (ゴジラ対宇宙怪獣 地球防衛命令, Gojira tai Uchū Kaijū: Chikyū Bōei Meirei) involved Miko, an alien being resembling a large brain, intends to conquer the Earth using King Ghidorah, Gigan, and Megalon (later to be reworked into the main villain in 1973's Godzilla vs. Megalon). However Godzilla and Anguirus appear in Tokyo in defense of Earth. Miko uses the three space monsters to install his being into a giant statue of Majin Tuol, a fictional Inca god, which has been erected at Tokyo's Science Land. Gigan uses the buzzsaw in his chest to cut the statue, causing it to bleed. Majin Tuol, now having come to life and inhabiting the statue, allies itself with Godzilla and Anguirus. The three Earth monsters defeat the space creatures and Godzilla destroys Miko. After the decisive battle, Majin Tuol again turns to stone. 

Sekizawa's pitch, titled King Ghidorah's Great Counterattack! (キングギドラの大逆襲!, Kingu Gidora no Daigyakushū!) or The Return of King Ghidorah, featured Godzilla, Rodan, and Varan in combat with King Ghidorah, Gigan, and a new monster called Mogu. Except for its monster cast, this draft was reportedly much closer to the final filmed version of Godzilla vs. Gigan.

Music
The majority of the film's soundtrack consists of recycled cues from previous Toho films such as Frankenstein Conquers the World, Atragon, King Kong Escapes, Battle in Outer Space, and several other Godzilla films. Akira Ifukube, who composed the music for those films, receives credit in the film. In addition to those stock tracks, several themes composed by Ifukube for the Mitsubishi Pavilion at Expo '70 are used throughout the movie. A new song called "Godzilla March", sung by Susumu Ishikawa and composed by Kunio Miyauchi, plays at the end of the film. Ishikawa also performed two more new songs ("Go! Go! Godzilla" and "Defeat Gigan") that were released on the soundtrack album.

Filming
This was Haruo Nakajima's final time playing Godzilla, a role he had played since 1954.

Presumably in order to cut costs, the film relies heavily on stock footage from previous films, such as Ghidorah the Three-Headed Monster, Invasion of Astro-Monster, War of the Gargantuas and Destroy All Monsters for Godzilla and King Ghidorah's fighting screentime.

This was the first film in which Godzilla actually drew blood. It first happens during the big battle later in the film when Gigan flies over past Godzilla and swipes his shoulder, and later, when Gigan repeatedly strikes a severely weakened Godzilla in his forehead. Also, Anguirus is cut in the snout by Gigan at one point, consequently bleeding towards the camera.

Creature design
Gigan was designed by Shōnen Magazine illustrator Takayoshi Mizuki, based on ideas by Teruyoshi Nakano. Mizuki was contacted in early 1971 by Toho production manager Masao Suzuki to design a space monster for a new Godzilla film.

According to Nakano, "the idea for Gigan was to create a monster with quite a different shape," wanting for the monster to be akin to a "richly colored dinosaur" and also being inspired by the designs of the multilayered jūnihitoe kimonos worn by Japanese court ladies. Mizuki created two potential looks for Gigan, a "triangular" design reminiscent of his final appearance, and a "circular" design sporting a number of hemispheres across its body. Mizuki aimed for a "sharp, florid" look when creating Gigan's design, and took inspiration after birds; he based Gigan's form on migratory birds such as geese, and adopted the sharpness of an eagle from his neck up.

In this film, King Ghidorah's three heads required completely new sculpts to be made, which were created by Nobuyuki Yasumaru. A year later, the suit would be used one final time for the television series Zone Fighter, before being formally retired.

Release

Box office
In Japan, the film sold approximately 1,780,000 tickets. The film earned ¥320 million in Japan distribution income (rentals) and grossed about  worldwide.

English version
Following the film's release in Japan in March, 1972, Toho commissioned Hong Kong broadcaster and voice actor Ted Thomas to produce an English language dub. As was usual with Toho's international export versions of its films, Godzilla vs. Gigan was left uncut, although the credits were changed to English. One significant change was made for this international version. In the Japanese release, speech bubbles, as seen in comic books, are used to depict a conversation between Godzilla and Anguirus. The speech bubbles were removed in original prints of the English version and the conversation was dubbed into English with Thomas as the voice of Godzilla.

In 1977, Mel Maron's Cinema Shares International Distribution purchased the North American rights to Godzilla vs. Gigan and released the film as Godzilla on Monster Island in the U.S. Rather than going to the expense of dubbing the film again, Cinema Shares utilized Toho's English dub. Aiming for a "G" rating from the MPAA, the company's editors removed three instances of blood from the monster scenes and muted the phrase "You're a hard bitch" on the soundtrack. Following the theatrical release, Godzilla on Monster Island entered television syndication.

In the 1980s, Toho had regained control of the film's American distribution rights and licensed the film to New World Pictures. New World's home video division released the international version of Godzilla vs. Gigan on video in 1988, fully uncut. Several budget re-releases of the film continued from New World's successors over the next decade. Shortly thereafter, the Sci-Fi Channel began broadcasting Cinema Shares' version, Godzilla on Monster Island, in the early 1990s. A letterboxed transfer of Toho's international version replaced Godzilla on Monster Island on the channel in 2002.

Home media
The film received several VHS releases during the 1990s by distributors such as Anchor Bay Entertainment and PolyGram Video. The film was released on DVD by Sony Pictures Home Entertainment on October 19, 2004, and on Blu-ray by Kraken Releasing on May 6, 2014. In 2019, the Japanese version was included in a Blu-ray box set released by the Criterion Collection, which included all 15 films from the franchise's Shōwa era.

References

Bibliography

External links

 Godzilla on the web (Japan)
 
 
 
 

1972 films
1970s Japanese-language films
1970s science fiction films
Alien invasions in films
Films scored by Akira Ifukube
Films about dragons
Films about extraterrestrial life
Films directed by Jun Fukuda
Films produced by Tomoyuki Tanaka
Films set in Kanagawa Prefecture
Films set in Tokyo
Films set in amusement parks
Films set on fictional islands
Giant monster films
Godzilla films
Japanese science fiction films
Japanese sequel films
Kaiju films
1970s monster movies
Toho films
Films with screenplays by Shinichi Sekizawa
1970s Japanese films